The Città di Vercelli – Trofeo Multimed is a tennis tournament held in Vercelli, Italy since 2014. The event is part of the ATP Challenger Tour and is played on outdoor clay courts.

Past finals

Singles

Doubles

References

External links

 
ATP Challenger Tour
Clay court tennis tournaments
Tennis tournaments in Italy